The 44th Walker Cup Match was played on September 7 and 8, 2013 at the National Golf Links of America in Southampton, New York. The United States won 17 to 9.

Format
On Saturday, there are four matches of foursomes in the morning and eight singles matches in the afternoon. On Sunday, there are again four matches of foursomes in the morning, followed by ten singles matches (involving every player) in the afternoon. In all, 26 matches are played.

Each of the 26 matches is worth one point in the larger team competition. If a match is all square after the 18th hole extra holes are not played. Rather, each side earns ½ a point toward their team total. The team that accumulates at least 13½ points wins the competition. In the event of a tie, the previous winner retains the Cup.

Teams
Ten players for the USA and Great Britain & Ireland participates in the event plus one non-playing captain for each team.

Note: "Rank" is the World Amateur Golf Ranking as of 4 September 2013.

Saturday's matches

Morning foursomes

Afternoon singles

Sunday's matches

Morning foursomes

Afternoon singles

References

External links
Official USGA site
44th Walker Cup Match site
National Golf Links of America

Walker Cup
Golf in New York (state)
Sports in Long Island
Walker Cup
Walker Cup
Walker Cup